Samuel Holland (17 October 1803 – 27 December 1892) was a Welsh Liberal Party politician.

Biography 
The son of Samuel, a Liverpool merchant, and Katherine Holland, Samuel Holland was born in Duke Street, Liverpool. He was educated in England and Germany and joined his father's company as an office boy.

At eighteen, Holland was made manager of the Rhiwbryfdir quarry near Blaenau Ffestiniog - later part of the Oakeley quarry. He conceived the narrow-gauge Ffestiniog Railway from Blaenau Ffestiniog to Porthmadog which carried  slates from his quarry to the harbour.

Holland was appointed High Sheriff of Merionethshire for 1862. He served as Liberal Member of Parliament (MP) for Merioneth from 1870 to 1885.

In 1875 Holland was active in setting up the Dr Williams School in Dolgellau. He became the first Chairman of the school's Board of Governors. In 1874, he was a constable of Harlech Castle, chairman of the Penrhyndeudraeth magistrates and chairman of the Festiniog Board of Guardians.

References 

Sources
Entry in Welsh Biography Online
Quarry Proprietors

External links 
 

1803 births
1892 deaths
Liberal Party (UK) MPs for Welsh constituencies
UK MPs 1868–1874
UK MPs 1874–1880
UK MPs 1880–1885
Politicians from Liverpool
High Sheriffs of Merionethshire